List of rivers in Mato Grosso do Sul (Brazilian State).

The list is arranged by drainage basin, with respective tributaries indented under each larger stream's name and ordered from downstream to upstream. All rivers in Mato Grosso do Sul drain to the Atlantic Ocean via the Paraná River.

By Drainage Basin 

 Paraná River
 Paraguay River
 Apa River
 Perdido River
 Caracol River
 Piripucu River
 Amanguijá River
 Tarunã River
 Tererê River
 Branco River
 Aquidabã River
 Nabileque River
 Novo River
 Miranda River
 Aquidauana River
 Taquaraçu River
 Cachoeirão River
 Varadouro River
 Salobra River
 Nioaque River
 Abobral River
 Negro River
 Capivari River
 Vazante Grande
 Taboco River
 Inhumas River
 Negrinho River
 Taquari River
 Taquari-Mirim River
 Coxim River
 Jauru River
 Novo River
 Do Peixe River
 Cuiabá River (São Lourenço River)
 Piqueri River
 Correntes River
 Curiche Grande River (Corixa Grande River)
 Iguatemi River
 Jagui River
 Pirajuí River
 Itaquiraí River
 Maracaí River
 Amambaí River
 Laranjaí River
 Ivinhema River
 Guareí River
 Vacaria River
 Brilhante River
 Dourados River
 São João River
 Santa Maria River
 Samambaia River
 Combate River
 Quitéro River
 Pardo River
 Anhanduí River
 Anhanduìzinho River
 Ribeirão Lontra
 Taquaruçu River
 Verde River
 São Domingos River
 Sucuriú River
 Brioso River
 Indaiá Grande River
 Pântano River
 Quitéria River
 Paranaíba River
 Santana River
 Barreiros River
 Aporé River

Alphabetically 

 Abobral River
 Amambaí River
 Amanguijá River
 Anhanduí River
 Anhanduìzinho River
 Apa River
 Aporé River
 Aquidabã River
 Aquidauana River
 Barreiros River
 Branco River
 Brilhante River
 Brioso River
 Cachoeirão River
 Capivari River
 Caracol River
 Combate River
 Correntes River
 Coxim River
 Cuiabá River (São Lourenço River)
 Curiche Grande River (Corixa Grande River)
 Dourados River
 Guareí River
 Iguatemi River
 Indaiá Grande River
 Inhumas River
 Itaquiraí River
 Ivinhema River
 Jagui River
 Jauru River
 Laranjaí River
 Ribeirão Lontra
 Maracaí River
 Miranda River
 Nabileque River
 Negrinho River
 Negro River
 Nioaque River
 Novo River
 Novo River
 Pântano River
 Paraguay River
 Paraná River
 Paranaíba River
 Pardo River
 Do Peixe River
 Perdido River
 Piqueri River
 Pirajuí River
 Piripucu River
 Quitéria River
 Quitéro River
 Salobra River
 Samambaia River
 Santa Maria River
 Santana River
 São Domingos River
 São João River
 Sucuriú River
 Taboco River
 Taquaraçu River
 Taquari River
 Taquari-Mirim River
 Taquaruçu River
 Tarunã River
 Tererê River
 Vacaria River
 Varadouro River
 Vazante Grande
 Verde River

References
 Map from Ministry of Transport
 Rand McNally, The New International Atlas, 1993.
  GEOnet Names Server

 
Mato Grosso du Sul
Environment of Mato Grosso do Sul